Cryptostegia madagascariensis is a species of flowering plant in the family Apocynaceae. It is commonly known as purple rubber vine, is a woody-perennial vine that is native to western and northern Madagascar. It has also been introduced to several tropical and subtropical regions by man, including  Puerto Rico and the Virgin Islands. It is very similar to the rubber vine (C. grandiflora), which is also native to Madagascar. In their area of overlap some hybrids have been observed, which are distinguishable by intermediate flower morphology. In the 1930s a hybrid was also developed for horticultural purposes.

References

Periplocoideae
Endemic flora of Madagascar
Taxa named by Wenceslas Bojer
Taxa named by Joseph Decaisne
Flora of the Madagascar dry deciduous forests
Flora of the Madagascar succulent woodlands